= Group green exercise =

Group Green Exercise refers to physical exercise undertaken in natural environments carried out as a group. Physical exercise has positive outcomes for both physical and mental health. There is growing evidence confirming the benefits to be had from contact with nature. The work of Prof. Jules Pretty at the University of Essex has revealed the synergistic benefits of combining the two in green exercise. New research, by Auckland University of Technology, is now investigating the additional social, physical and mental health benefits of Group Green Exercise.
